WYDN (channel 48) is a religious television station licensed to Lowell, Massachusetts, United States, broadcasting the Daystar network to the Boston area. It is owned and operated by the Educational Public TV Corporation, a subsidiary of Daystar sister company Word of God Fellowship, Inc. WYDN's studios are co-located with those of local public access channel Dedham TV on Sprague Street in Dedham, and it shares transmitter facilities with Concord, New Hampshire–licensed Ion Television station WPXG-TV (channel 21) on Fort Mountain near Epsom, New Hampshire.

History
The station first signed on the air on May 5, 1999, as an affiliate of Prime Time Christian Broadcasting (now God's Learning Channel) as a straight simulcast of KMLM in Odessa, Texas. Originally licensed to Worcester, Massachusetts, WYDN operated its analog transmitter atop Asnebumskit Hill in Paxton (a site which is and has been used by Worcester area FM and TV stations since FM pioneer Edwin Howard Armstrong erected the tower in the 1940s) until the June 12, 2009, digital transition; its digital transmitter operated from the WBZ-TV tower in Needham. By the early 2000s, the station switched to Daystar after it was acquired by its Word of God Fellowship, Inc. licensing subsidiary, and Daystar immediately pushed for successful must-carry carriage from local cable providers.

WYDN sold its frequency rights as part of the Federal Communications Commission (FCC)'s 2017 spectrum incentive auction and reached a channel sharing agreement with Ion Television O&O WPXG-TV; it began broadcasting from WPXG's transmitter on April 23, 2018. As WPXG's broadcasting radius does not cover Worcester, WYDN changed its city of license to Lowell, Massachusetts.

Technical information

Analog-to-digital conversion
WYDN shut down its analog signal, over UHF channel 48, on June 12, 2009, the official date in which full-power television stations in the United States transitioned from analog to digital broadcasts under federal mandate. The station's digital signal continued to broadcasts on its pre-transition UHF channel 47. Through the use of PSIP, digital television receivers display the station's virtual channel as its former UHF analog channel 48.

See also 
 Channel 33 digital TV stations in the United States
 Channel 48 virtual TV stations in the United States
 List of television stations in Massachusetts
 List of Daystar (TV network) affiliates

References

External links 
 Daystar Television Network

1999 establishments in Massachusetts
Companies based in Dedham, Massachusetts
Daystar (TV network) affiliates
Mass media in Lowell, Massachusetts
Television channels and stations established in 1999
YDN